Byrnestown is a rural locality in the North Burnett Region, Queensland, Australia.

The town was established as one of the first communes in Queensland.

History
In response to the idea of communes promulgated by utopian William Lane, in 1893 the Queensland Government legislated the Queensland Co-operative Communities Land Settlement Act to allow a group of 30 or more men and their families to establish a commune in Queensland.   This led to many groups forming to pursue the goal of establishing a commune; one of these groups called themselves Byrnestown after the then Queensland Attorney-General Thomas Joseph Byrnes (who became Premier of Queensland in 1898).

In late 1893, sites near Roma were deemed too far from the town.
In January 1893, the Byrnestown group inspected land in the Burnett area and found it suitable, having a water supply from the Wetherton Creek and frontage to the prospective railway to Gayndah. As a result, the Byrnestown commune (comprising 34 members) was registered on 24 February 1894 receiving  for an 8-year term. Another group calling themselves Resolute selected land immediately to the east of the Byrnestown group, while a third group Bon Accord also took land in the Burnett area at Bon Accord.

The first of the Byrnestown settlers arrived in March 1894. Although all communes were given initial funds, by June 1894, Byrnestown requested and received additional financial assistance. By October 1894, there were 169 people in the Byrnestown commune: 34 men, 28 wives and 107 children. The group had erected numerous bark dwellings, farm buildings and were beginning work on a school building, but had made more limited progress on clearing and planting the land.

The Byrnestown commune did not succeed. As early as November 1894, there were allegations (denied by the group) that some of their members were working outside the commune but not contributing their wages to the commune as their agreement required. The following month some members were petitioning the government for funds, saying that the commune's management committee was denying them food. At the agricultural show at Degilbo in February 1895, it was revealed that 6 men had left the group and a further 9 were refusing to work, with the group's secretary suggesting the internal disputes arose from differences in nationality and religion. An inspection in April 1895 reported on limited progress at cultivation of the land, possibly linked to the number of men in the group working outside the commune. By July 1895, members of group had resorted to legal action over the management committee refusal to provide food to members who disagreed with their decisions. Byrnestown was not alone in its failure; in August 1895 a report by the Under-Secretary for Agriculture revealed most of the communes established were "in a state of collapse" and that there was little prospect of them being economically self-supporting.

One small success for the commune was the opening of the Byrnestown Provisional School on 4 September 1895. However, the Byrnestown commune soon complained that children from the neighbouring Resolute commune were attending their school without contributing to it.

In October 1895, the Byrnestown committee instituted a system of punishments for any member (or their wife) who criticised their commune or suggested it might not be a success. In December 1895, the Queensland Government passed legislation to enable communes to be dissolved and the communal land divided among the members. The members of Byrnestown immediately petitioned the Queensland Government to divide their communal land into individual portions. In April 1896,  of the Byrnestown communal land was divided among 16 of its members, bringing the commune to an end. Those members who chose to take up individual land generally succeeded in their enterprise and were described less than two years later in February 1896 as "doing pretty well", suggesting that dissolution of the commune had rid the community of those men unsuited to agriculture or generally disinclined to work.

A report by R. W. Winks of the Department of Agriculture, Brisbane, surveying for the proposed Degilbo to Gayndah railway line extension, dated 10 November 1897 stated:- "The first really good piece of country of any extent begins some little distance from the coach stage at Wetheron, Two Mile, extending beyond the head station and running thence in a south-westerly direction to Oakey Creek. It is principally composed of fine, black and chocolate soil ridges, even in contour, and in many places lightly timbered with broad-leafed ironbark and a kind of bloodwood. In some parts there is scarcely any timber, from which fact a portion of this zone is known locally as the Wetheron Clear Lands. Want of water is the chief drawback, but from some wells I saw on what was once group property, it would appear that good water can be obtained by comparatively shallow sinking.

In 1903, there were over  under cultivation, growing mostly maize, potatoes and fodder crops; the main barrier to greater prosperity was the distance to the railway.

The Byrnestown Provisional School was originally housed in a bark humpy, but, through the efforts of Roman Catholic priest Father Michael Joseph McKiernan, it was replaced by a more substantial building. It became a state school in 1909. A second school, Byrnestown Central State School, opened on 20 May 1913, after which the first school was often known as Old Byrnestown School. The old school closed in 1931 and its buildings were relocated in 1932 to Wilson Valley. In 1938, Byrnestown Central State School was renamed Byrnestown State School. It closed on 31 December 1970.

Byrnestown Post Office opened by November 1903 (a receiving office had been open from 1898) and closed in 1911. Byrnestown Railway Station Post Office opened by June 1910 (a receiving office had been open from 1909, briefly known as Ginoon) and closed in 1974.

In August 1913, local residents desired to establish a Roman Catholic church in the town. At that time, the town had a hall which was used both for church services and recreational purposes, but following the establishment of a concert hall by Mr Christensen, the hall was only used for church services. Peter McSween senior donated an acre of land for the church and the residents decided to relocate the old hall to the donated land. On 25 July 1914, Archbishop James Duhig opened St Peter's Catholic Church with 250 people in attendance. The building was designed and built by local contractor Harry Head. On 1 December 1923, the church was blown down in a storm. It was decided in August 1924 to construct a new church rather than try to repair the damaged building. The contract for the new church was given to George William Jealous of Gayndah at a cost of over £1000. The new Catholic Church of the Sacred Heart was opened in Byrnestown on 22 February 1925 by Roman Catholic Archbishop James Duhig. The church was damaged in a cyclone in 1959. In 1969 the church was moved to Gayndah to serve as the church hall for St Joseph's Catholic Church there. To reduce the risk of future cyclone damage, the roof was lowered by reducing the height of the walls and reducing the pitch of the roof.

In May 1931, a railway carriage carrying the Queensland Premier Arthur Edward Moore and Robert Boyd MLA and their wives came detached during shunting operations at the Gooroolba junction and rolled away, gathering speed down a streep grade. It hurtled, swaying dangerously, through Byrnestown railway station and eventually came to a halt five miles later on flat ground near the Wetheron railway station. Nobody was hurt.

Heritage listing
The Byrnestown Commune and Cemetery are listed on the North Burnett Regional Council's local heritage register.

References

Further reading

External links
 
  – map of Byrnestown commune
  – map showing communes in the Burnett area

Localities in Queensland
North Burnett Region
Utopian communities